Sócrates Buenaventura Villegas O.P. (born September 28, 1960) is a Filipino prelate, and a professed member of the Dominican Order, He is the current Archbishop of Lingayen-Dagupan in Pangasinan, and is the former president of the Catholic Bishops' Conference of the Philippines, from December 1, 2013 to December 1, 2017, when he finished his second and final term as president of the said conference. He was also the vice president of the episcopal conference from 2011 to 2013. He had previously served as Bishop of Balanga in Bataan from July 3, 2004 until November 4, 2009.

Family and education
The youngest of the three children of Emiliano Villegas and Norma Buenaventura both from Pateros, he was born on September 28, 1960.

He went through basic education at the Pateros Elementary School, Pateros Catholic School and Colegio de San Juan de Letran. He studied for the priesthood at San Carlos Seminary with a degree Master of Arts in Theological Studies.

Priesthood and bishop years
He was ordained priest on October 5, 1985 and bishop on August 31, 2001 by the late Jaime Cardinal Sin whom he served as private secretary for fifteen years and as Vicar General for 13 years. He then became the first Rector of the EDSA Shrine and Vicar General of the Archdiocese of Manila in concurrent capacity.

Appointed auxiliary bishop of Manila on July 25, 2001, he was ordained to the episcopacy on August 31, 2001 until his transfer to Balanga on July 3, 2004. He became the Bishop of Balanga from July 3, 2004 until his transfer to Lingayen-Dagupan on November 4, 2009. After he became archbishop of Lingayen-Dagupan on November 4, 2009, Victor de la Cruz Ocampo (who served as Bishop of Gumaca from September 3, 2015 to March 16, 2023) became the diocesan administrator of the diocese that he formerly headed until Ruperto Cruz Santos (also a fellow priest of the Archdiocese of Manila) became his successor as bishop of Balanga on July 8, 2010.

Due to the sudden death of the San Fernando de La Union Bishop Artemio Rillera, he was also appointed Apostolic Administrator of the said vacant See from November 16, 2011 until October 11, 2012 in a concurrent capacity.
 
He was the Chairman of the Episcopal Commission for Catechesis and Catholic Education of the CBCP from 2003 until 2012 and formerly a member of the Presidential Committee of the Pontifical Council for the Family. He is currently the Chairman of the CBCP Episcopal Commission for Seminaries.
 
He joined the Order of Preachers. He is a chaplain of the Order of Malta and the Equestrian Order of the Holy Sepulchre.
 
He was a synodal father in the Synod of Bishops of 2012 and 2014. He is a member of the Council of the papal foundation Aid to the Church in Need.
 
As of February 2021, he has ordained 234 deacons and 210 priests since his episcopal ordination. In the Archdiocese of Lingayen Dagupan, he has decreed the creation of twelve new parishes and nine quasi parishes, since his installation as Archbishop on November 4, 2009 by opening the archdiocese to the missionary presence of religious priests.
 
He opened the first diocesan theology seminary in northern Philippines in 2013 called Mary Help of Christians Theology Seminary which grants civil master’s degrees in theology and pastoral ministry.

Civic involvement 
In the secular field, he was one of the Ten Outstanding Young Men of the Philippines in the year 2000 and a Catholic Authors Awardee in 1994. The Bataan Peninsula State University conferred upon him a Doctor of Humanities degree honoris causa in recognition of his work for the Province of Bataan. He authored ten books of homilies and spiritual meditations since he was priest of the Archdiocese of Manila until now.

Activity
He is a member of Dominican Clerical Fraternity of the Philippines (DCFP), the Sovereign Military Order of Malta and the Equestrian Order of the Holy Sepulchre of Jerusalem. He was the CEO of the Tenth World Youth Day held in Manila in 1995 and the Fourth World Meeting of Families in 2002.

In August 2005, Villegas told Filipino Catholics that they "cannot participate in any way or even attend religious or legal ceremonies that celebrate and legitimize homosexual unions".

Philippine politics
Villegas' views on social and political issues in the Philippines have not been without controversy, mainly regarding high-profile issues such as the Reproductive Health Bill, the re-imposition of death penalty (long-opposed by the Catholic Church), human rights violations, extrajudicial killings under the Duterte administration, and the burial of dictator Ferdinand Marcos at the Libingan ng mga Bayani (Heroes' Cemetery).

Following the 31st Anniversary of the 1986 EDSA People Power Revolution on February 25, 2017, Villegas published a 'letter' to his mentor, the late Jaime Cardinal Sin, where he denounced corruption, extrajudicial killings, and the restoration of the Marcos family to political power under the Duterte administration. Villegas lamented that "the dictator ousted by People Power is now buried among heroes. The Lady of one thousand two hundred pairs of shoes is now Representative in Congress." Villegas' remarks were criticized by Duterte's daughter, then-Davao City mayor and now Vice President Sara Duterte-Carpio, who described Villegas as "worse than a hundred President Dutertes".

On July 19, 2019, the PNP–Criminal Investigation and Detection Group (CIDG) filed charges against Villegas and members of the opposition for "sedition, cyber libel, libel, estafa, harboring a criminal, and obstruction of justice". Members of the opposition, as well as local and international human rights groups including Human Rights Watch and Amnesty International, denounced the charges as a politically motivated move intended to silence criticism of Duterte and his presidency. The charges were eventually dropped because of lack of evidence.

In regards to vote buying, Villegas expressed the position that a voters who accept money from people to vote for certain politicians may not be necessarily committing a sin – if the voter does not fulfill their agreement even if they accept the money.

Coat of arms

References

External links

Listing in Catholic Hierarchy website 
website Manila Archdiocese
Explanation coat of arms

People from Bataan
People from Pangasinan
Dominican bishops
21st-century Roman Catholic archbishops in the Philippines
Living people
1960 births
People from Pateros
Roman Catholic archbishops of Lingayen–Dagupan
Presidents of the Catholic Bishops' Conference of the Philippines